Sant Antoni de Portmany is a municipality on the North central coast of Ibiza. The municipality is situated on Sant Antoni Bay on the north west seaboard of the island, part of the Spanish autonomous community of the Balearic Islands.The total number of inhabitants in the municipality (2009) is 21,852.

The municipality encompasses the following towns and villages:

Local Government
The current Mayor of Sant Antoni de Portmany  is Marcos Serra Colomar (Partit Popular (Espanya)) (2019)

See also
 The Town of Sant Antoni de Portmany

External links
 The Town Hall website
 Local government website
 Statistical Institute information of the Balearic Islands

References

Municipalities in Ibiza
Mediterranean port cities and towns in Spain